Mponeng Winston Rabotapi is a South African politician of the Democratic Alliance (DA). He has been serving as the party's caucus leader in the North West Provincial Legislature since 2019. He previously served as a Member of the National Assembly from 2009 to 2019.

Political career

Rabotapi served as a municipal councillor for the Democratic Party in the Brits municipality. He also served as the party's Deputy Provincial Leader for two separate terms.

Rabotapi was elected to the National Assembly of South Africa in 2009. He became a Member on 6 May 2009. On 14 May 2009, Democratic Alliance Parliamentary Leader Athol Trollip named Rabotapi as the Shadow Deputy Minister of Public Works.

In February 2012,  the DA Parliamentary Leader Lindiwe Mazibuko appointed him to the position of Shadow Minister of Sports and Recreation.

After the 2014 elections, the DA Parliamentary Leader Mmusi Maimane retained Rabotapi in the Shadow Cabinet and moved him to the Arts and Culture portfolio.

The Democratic Alliance parliamentary caucus elected Rabotapi as a party whip in February 2016.

Following the 2019 elections, Rabotapi moved to the North West Provincial Legislature. He was sworn into office on 22 May 2019 and the DA's caucus elected him caucus leader.

References

Living people
Democratic Alliance (South Africa) politicians
Members of the National Assembly of South Africa
People from North West (South African province)
Members of the North West Provincial Legislature
Year of birth missing (living people)
Tswana people